Bryson may refer to:

People and fictional characters
 Bryson (surname)
 Bryson (given name)

Places

Canada
 Bryson, Quebec, a village and municipality
 Bryson, a hydroelectric station in Quebec

United States
 Bryson, Missouri, an unincorporated community
 Bryson City, North Carolina, a town
 Bryson, Texas, a city in Jack County
 Bryson Independent School District, Jack County, Texas

Other uses
 Bryson Apartment Hotel, Los Angeles, California
 Bryson College, a college in Fayetteville, Tennessee, United States from 1919 to 1929
 Bryson High School (disambiguation)

See also
 Brydon (disambiguation)